Kyle Ihn (born December 10, 1994) is an American soccer player who plays as a goalkeeper for OKC Energy FC of the USL Championship.

Career

College and Amateur
Ihn played four years of college soccer for the Green Bay Phoenix at the University of Wisconsin–Green Bay between 2013 and 2016. While at college, Ihn played with Premier Development League side Kokomo Mantis FC during their 2016 season. Following college, he also appeared for Des Moines Menace.

Professional
On March 30, 2018, Ihn signed a professional contract with USL club Reno 1868. Ihn was released by Reno on December 3, 2018.

On January 10, 2019, it was announced that Ihn had signed with Lansing Ignite of USL League One.

Ihn joined USL Championship side OKC Energy FC on January 10, 2020.

On September 5, 2020, Ihn joined USL Championship side Rio Grande Valley FC on loan for the remainder of the season.

References

External links
 
 

1994 births
Living people
American soccer players
Association football goalkeepers
Des Moines Menace players
Green Bay Phoenix men's soccer players
Lansing Ignite FC players
People from Waukesha County, Wisconsin
Reno 1868 FC players
Soccer players from Wisconsin
Sportspeople from the Milwaukee metropolitan area
USL Championship players
USL League One players
USL League Two players
OKC Energy FC players
Rio Grande Valley FC Toros players